Michelle Elizabeth Keegan (born 3 June 1987) is an English actress, known for her roles as Tina McIntyre in the ITV soap opera Coronation Street and Sergeant Georgie Lane in the BBC drama series Our Girl. Keegan also starred as Tracy Shawcross in BBC One drama Ordinary Lies, Tina Moore in the biopic Tina and Bobby, and Erin Croft in Sky Max comedy Brassic.

Early life
Keegan was born in Stockport to Michael Keegan and Jackie Turner. Her maternal great-grandmother was a Gibraltarian who married a British soldier stationed in Gibraltar, and she also has distant Italian ancestry from her 7 times great-grandfather who emigrated to Gibraltar from Genoa. She has Irish ancestry on her father's side.

She attended St Patrick's RC High School in Eccles near Manchester, and later the Manchester School of Acting. She worked at Selfridges in the Trafford Centre, and as a check-in agent at Manchester Airport.

Career
In late 2007, in only her second audition, Keegan was offered the part of Tina McIntyre in Coronation Street, and accepted the role, beating around 900 other people who auditioned. She decided to leave the show after six years in 2013 and Tina was killed off, making her last appearance on 2 June 2014. Throughout her time on the show, Keegan's character Tina featured in many high-profile storylines. The Guardian listed her as one of the 10 best Coronation Street characters of all time in 2010. In 2008, the actress flew out to South Africa to film the straight-to-DVD film Coronation Street: Out of Africa, a Coronation Street spinoff, in which she appeared as Tina.

In June 2009, Keegan made her radio debut co-hosting the BBC Radio 1 programme The Official Chart. She was featured on the cover of FHM magazine in January 2011 and placed at number30 and number26 in their 100 Sexiest Women poll for 2010 and 2011, respectively. She appeared on their cover again in March 2013 and was placed at number four in the 2013 poll, eventually winning in 2015.

Keegan made a guest appearance as herself in the 2009 Easter special, Red Dwarf: Back to Earth. In June 2014, she embarked on a European tour to perform as Tinkerbell in Peter Pan.

In 2015, she was cast as Tracy Shawcross in the BBC television drama series Ordinary Lies. In June 2015, it was announced that she would play the starring role of Corporal Georgie Lane in series 2 of the BBC drama series Our Girl, which aired throughout September 2016; third season consisting of 12 episodes began airing in October 2017. She returned for her final series as Georgie in 2020. Also in 2016, Keegan landed a guest role on the ITV2 comedy series Plebs. In June 2016, she began filming the ITV drama series Tina and Bobby, based on Tina Dean's and Bobby Moore's relationship in which she played Tina; it was a three part series which aired in January 2017. In 2017, Michelle Keegan partnered with the clothing brand Lipsy with her own collection.

Keegan currently portrays the main role of Erin Croft in Sky One's comedy drama series, Brassic, which started in 2019. On 22 February 2022, Keegan was a guest judge on the Snatch Game episode of RuPaul's Drag Race: UK vs the World. In May 2022, the BBC and STAN commissioned a new series starring Keegan,Ten Pound Poms, a drama about the British citizens who migrated to Australia after the Second World War, with filming commencing in Australia shortly after.

Personal life
Keegan was in a relationship with The Wanted singer Max George from December 2010. The couple became engaged in June 2011, but ended their relationship the following year. In September 2013, after a nine-month courtship, the actress announced her engagement to Mark Wright. They married on 24 May 2015.

Filmography

Stage

Awards and nominations

References

External links

 

21st-century English actresses
1987 births
Actresses from Greater Manchester
English people of Spanish descent
British people of Gibraltarian descent
English people of Irish descent
English people of Italian descent
English soap opera actresses
English television actresses
Living people
People from Stockport